Alan Hale or Allan Hale may refer to:

Alan Hale Sr. (1892–1950), American actor, father of Alan Hale Jr.
Allan M. Hale (1914–1997), American jurist, first Chief Justice (1972–84) of Massachusetts Appeals Court#Justices
Alan Hale, American radio announcer in 1942 (List of Los Angeles Dodgers broadcasters#List of current and former broadcasters and stations)
Alan Hale Jr. (1921–1990), American actor, "Skipper" on Gilligan's Island, son of Alan Hale Sr.
Alan Hale (politician) (1953–2016), American Republican legislator from Montana
Alan Hale (astronomer) (born 1958), American astronomer
Allan Hale (born 1987), Scottish manager of Maud F.C. from 2011 to 2018 (2017–18 North Superleague#Member clubs for the 2017–18 season)

See also
Allen Haley (1844–1900), Canadian Member of Parliament
Hale (surname)